is a passenger railway station on the Minato Line in the city of Hitachinaka, Ibaraki, Japan, operated by the third-sector railway operator Hitachinaka Seaside Railway.

Lines

Station layout
The station has a single island platform, of which only one side is in use. The platform is connected to the station building by a level crossing. The station is unattended.

History
Ajigaura Station opened on 7 July 1928. as a station on the Minato Railway.  It became an unstaffed station from 1 April 1996.

Future development
Minato Line is extended to a new station which is located near Hitachi Seaside Park in 2024.

Passenger statistics
In fiscal 2011, the station was used by an average of 53 passengers daily.

Surrounding area
Sakatsurai Isozaki Shrine
Ajigaura swimming beach
Hitachi Seaside Park

References

External links

 Hitachinaka Seaside Railway station information 

Railway stations in Ibaraki Prefecture
Railway stations in Japan opened in 1928
Hitachinaka, Ibaraki